Harry Lyons was a baseball player.

Harry Lyons may also refer to:

Harry Lyons (politician) (1900–1962), politician in the Canadian province of Ontario
Harry Agar Lyons (1878–1944), actor
Harry Lyons, character in Algie the Miner

See also
Harry Lyon (disambiguation)
Henry Lyons (disambiguation)
Harold Lyons (disambiguation)